is a Japanese romance josei manga  series written and illustrated by Kazumi Kazui. It is published by Shogakukan, with serialization on the Petit Comic manga magazine from July 8, 2011, to September 10, 2015, and is completed in ten volumes. It is published in French by Soleil. A live-action television drama series adaptation premiered in September 2021.

Characters

Media

Manga

Volumes
1 (February 10, 2012)
2 (June 8, 2012)
3 (November 9, 2012)
4 (April 10, 2013)
5 (August 9, 2013)
6 (February 10, 2014)
7 (September 10, 2014)
8 (January 9, 2015)
9 (April 10, 2015)
10 (September 10, 2015)

Drama
On August 2, 2021, MBS announced that it will produce a live-action television series adaptation. The series  premiered on September 16, 2021, and is directed by Yō Kawahara, who is also writing scripts alongside Yuna Suzuki.

Reception
Volume 3 reached the 39th place on the weekly Oricon manga charts and, as of November 18, 2012, had sold 36,676 copies; volume 4 reached the 24th place and, as of April 13, 2013, had sold 30,193 copies; volume 6 reached the 7th place and, as of February 16, 2014, had sold 37,540 copies; volume 7 reached the 26th place and, as of September 14, 2014, had sold 31,763 copies; volume 8 reached the 43rd place and, as of January 18, 2015, had sold 39,151 copies; volume 9 reached the 42nd place and, as of April 19, 2015, had sold 37,906 copies.

References

External links

Josei manga
Mainichi Broadcasting System original programming
Romance anime and manga
Shogakukan manga